Bergen is a municipality and a village in the south-eastern Netherlands.

Population centres

The village of Bergen 
The village of Bergen lies about 28 km north of Venlo, close to the river Meuse. Although the municipality is named after this village, the municipal hall is located in the town of Nieuw-Bergen, the largest village in the municipality. Located near the German border, approximately 5 miles from Nieuw-Bergen, with Weeze Airport also being just a short distance away.

In 2001, Bergen had 304 inhabitants. The built-up area of the village was 0.09 km², and contained 109 residences.

Topography 

Gem-BergenL-OpenTopo

Notable people 
 Klaas de Groot (born 1940 in Bergen) is Emeritus Professor at the University of Twente, does research and development of bioceramics
 Theo Nikkessen  (born 1941 in Siebengewald) a retired Dutch amateur track cyclist, competed at the 1960 Summer Olympics
 Rob Mulders (1967 in Well – 1998) a Dutch road racing cyclist
 Lieke Martens (born 1992 in Bergen) a Dutch footballer who plays for Paris Saint Germain (PSG), UEFA Women's Player of the Year in 2017 and FIFA Women's Player of The Year

Gallery

References

External links

Official website

 
Municipalities of Limburg (Netherlands)
Populated places in Limburg (Netherlands)